"Dance with My Father" is a song by Luther Vandross and the title track to his thirteenth studio album. It was released in May 2003 as the album's lead single. With Julian  Williams, Richard Marx, Vandross wrote the song based on his personal experience. The lyrics recall childhood memories with Vandross' father, who used to dance with him and his mother.

Despite the lack of promotion due in part to Vandross' hospitalization, "Dance with My Father" became one of the most requested songs at the time. During the 2004 Grammy Awards, "Dance with My Father" earned Vandross the Song of the Year and Best Male R&B Vocal Performance accolades.

Composition and release
Vandross wrote "Dance with My Father" with Marx, based on his personal experience. Considered by Vandross as his "career song", "Dance with my Father" is a tribute to his father, Luther Vandross Sr., who died due to complications of diabetes. Vandross was eight when his father died. According to Marx, writing the song was emotional for Vandross because it is "a subject matter [Vandross] hadn't written before".

On the backdrop of strings and interplay of piano and drums, Vandross recalls fond memories with his late father who used to dance with his mother. Mary Ida, his mother, says, "I was amazed at how well Luther remembered his father, how we used to dance and sing in the house. I was so surprised that at  years of age, he could remember what a happy household we had." Barry Walters of Rolling Stone magazine qualifies the memories invoked in the lyrics as painful and private, adding that when Vandross asks God to return his father, it "turn a potentially maudlin song into a meditative, deeply personal prayer".

At the time of "Dance with My Father"'s release as a single on May 30, 2003, Vandross had been hospitalized due to his suffering from stroke. This timely release of the song gained attention from critics. On his review for the album, David Jeffries of AllMusic wrote that its release "makes the song's references to absent loved ones even more poignant". For Larry Flick of The Advocate, it transformed the song into "a haunting composition rife with subtext".

Reception
Although Vandross was unable to promote the latest project, "Dance with My Father" was able to reach number one on music stations. For instance, it achieved top position in WLTW, which was one of the first stations in the United States to play the track. Before his stroke, Vandross wrote to WLTW's program director, informing him of what he considered to be his "career song". The director asked permission from the label, but it was not until after the hospitalization that J Records permitted the airplay, following the song being featured in Boston Public on April 28, 2003. "Dance with My Father" became one of the most requested songs at the time, spawning "a number of weepy phone calls and requests".

In February 2004, "Dance with My Father" earned Vandross and Marx a Grammy Award for Song of the Year and Vandross a Grammy Award for Best Male R&B Vocal Performance. Marx accepted the award on behalf of Vandross, who was unable to attend due to health concerns. At the same event, singer Celine Dion agreed to perform a live rendition of the song in lieu of Vandross, and Marx accompanied her on the piano as she recently lost her father. After the performance, Vandross however accepted the awards on a videotaped speech.

With his death in 2005, "Dance with My Father" was the last top 40 hit for Luther Vandross in the United States, peaking at number 38. The song also peaked at 21 in the UK Singles Chart. On August 29, 2009, the song re-entered the UK top 40 after a performance of the song on The X Factor by Joe McElderry.

Music video
While Vandross was hospitalized, a music video was shot for the single. Hosting famous friends of his and fans alike, the clip features musicians, singers, actors and sport stars. The video features childhood snapshots of Vandross.

Celebs who made cameos are Monica, Beyoncé, Brian McKnight, Johnny Gill, Stevie Wonder, Garcelle Beauvais, Damon Wayans, Holly Robinson Peete, Whitney Houston, Jason Kidd, Master P, Lil Romeo, Babyface, Morris Chestnut, Ashanti, Celine Dion, Nona Gaye, Patti LaBelle, Ruben Studdard, Brandy, Quincy Jones, Wyclef Jean, Wayne Brady and Shaquille O'Neal.

Versions and appearances
"Dance with My Father" has been released in various cover versions, appearing on many albums and music media formats. Among the most notable is a version released in 2004 by country music singer Kellie Coffey. This version peaked at No. 41 on the Billboard Hot Country Singles & Tracks (now Hot Country Songs) charts.

Charts

Weekly charts

Year-end charts

Certifications

References

2000s ballads
2003 singles
2003 songs
Grammy Award for Song of the Year
Luther Vandross songs
Kellie Coffey songs
Songs written by Richard Marx
Songs about fathers
Songs about dancing
Commemoration songs
Buddy Jewell songs
Celine Dion songs
Richard Marx songs
Songs written by Luther Vandross
BNA Records singles
J Records singles
Music videos directed by Diane Martel
Pop ballads
Contemporary R&B ballads